Tatyana Rostislavovna Mitkova (born September 13, 1957 in Moscow) is a Russian television journalist for NTV. She became famous in 1991 for refusing to read the official Soviet Union version of the military response to the uprising in Lithuania. In 2001, BBC News described her as one of Russia's "best-known news presenters".

In 1991, she received one of the first International Press Freedom Awards from the Committee to Protect Journalists.

In January 2001, she was summoned by prosecutors to discuss an alleged $70,000 loan from NTV. The summons came in the midst of an attempted takeover of the station by Gazprom, and Mitkova described it as "psychological pressure and a direct threat to journalists." At the end of the month, a Moscow court gave Gazprom control of NTV's owner Media-Most, which was by then described by BusinessWeek as "Russia's sole independent national television station" and by The New York Times as "the last nationwide voice critical of President Vladimir V. Putin". Despite a lockout of some journalists who refused to "pledge loyalty" to the new management, Mitkova was persuaded to stay with the station by new owner Boris Jordan.

References

External links 
 Татьяна Ростиславовна Миткова

1957 births
Living people
Writers from Moscow
Moscow State University alumni
Russian television journalists